Thomas Witter Ltd v TBP Industries [1996] 2 All ER 573 is an English contract law case, concerning misrepresentation. Doubt has been cast in its decision as to availability of rescission by Floods of Queensferry Ltd v Shand Construction Ltd and Government of Zanzibar v British Aerospace (Lancaster House) Ltd.

Facts
In December 1989, D, a conglomerate negotiated the sale of a carpet company to P. In the course of so doing D negligently misrepresented that there was a special one off expense of GBP 120,000 in accounts produced, and that those accounts spread the bi-annual expense of producing pattern books over two years instead of immediately writing it off. The sale contract included a provision stating that P acknowledged it had not been induced to enter into the agreement by any representation or warranty, and a contractual limitation clause that D was not liable for a breach of the agreement unless written notice was given by January 1, 1992. When P sued for negligent misrepresentation, D sought to rely on those two contractual provisions.

Judgment
Jacob J held rescission was no longer available where it was impossible to restore the parties to their positions before the contract. He referred to the Solicitor General while the Act was being passed, however, saying that damages could be awarded where rescission was no longer available, and so under s 2(2) the right to damages did not depend on the right to rescission - it was only necessary that the right to rescind had existed in the past - even if there was a bar now.

See also

English contract law
Misrepresentation in English law

Notes

English misrepresentation case law
High Court of Justice cases
1996 in case law
1996 in British law